John Vincent Griffith (born December 24, 1947) is an American academic administrator that served as the 16th president of Presbyterian College in Clinton, South Carolina. He previously served as the president of Lyon College in Batesville, Arkansas.

References

1947 births
American academic administrators
Dickinson College alumni
Harvard University alumni
Syracuse University alumni
Presbyterian College faculty
Presidents of Presbyterian College
Living people